Lost Lake is a lake in Clare County, Michigan, United States. It is 66-acre (270,000 m2) large and focal point for Boy Scout activities on the Lost Lake Scout Reservation.

See also
List of lakes in Michigan

References

Bodies of water of Clare County, Michigan
Lakes of Michigan